Anderson Township is the name of four townships in the U.S. state of Indiana:

 Anderson Township, Madison County, Indiana
 Anderson Township, Perry County, Indiana
 Anderson Township, Rush County, Indiana
 Anderson Township, Warrick County, Indiana

Indiana township disambiguation pages